South Carolina Highway 11 (SC 11), also known as the Cherokee Foothills Scenic Highway, is a  state highway through the far northern part of the U.S. state of South Carolina, following the southernmost peaks of the Blue Ridge Mountains. The route is surrounded by peach orchards, quaint villages, and parks. It is an alternative to Interstate 85 (I-85) and has been featured by such publications as National Geographic, Rand McNally, and Southern Living.

Route description
SC 11 is located entirely within the U.S. state of South Carolina, beginning in southern Oconee County as Exit 1 of Interstate 85 , 0.6 mi (1 km) from the South Carolina and Georgia border. After Oconee County, Highway 11 enters northern Pickens County, where bridges carry it over Lake Keowee and it passes near Table Rock State Park before it leaves the county.  Next comes Greenville County, where Highway 11 runs together with U.S. Highway 276 for several miles near Cleveland before splitting off on a more westerly route and crossing U.S. Highway 25 near Tigerville. Highway 11 then enters northern Spartanburg County, where it has an interchange with Interstate 26 near Campobello and Landrum. Finally, Highway 11 passes into Cherokee County, crossing Interstate 85 near Gaffney and ending shortly thereafter.

History

The current highway was once part of the "Cherokee Path" or "Keowee Path," this road was the route used by the Cherokee Indians and the English and French fur traders and stretched from Tennessee to Charleston, South Carolina. This National Scenic Byway winds its way through Upstate South Carolina and passes through some towns, such as Walhalla, Marietta, Campobello, Chesnee, and Gaffney. Echoes of the area's Cherokee heritage can still be heard in places and river names like Seneca, Savannah, Keowee, Jocassee, Enoree, Toxaway, Tugaloo, Tokena, and Eastatoee.

In the city of Gaffney, east of I-85, SC 11 is known as "Floyd Baker Boulevard," which is a well-known street name in Upstate South Carolina. This section of SC 11 is a vast contrast to the rest of the route. At this point the highway becomes heavily congested and developed. Gaffney is also the biggest town along the route.

South Carolina Highway 112

South Carolina Highway 112 (SC 112) was a state highway that was established in July 1936 on a path from SC 9 in New Prospect to U.S. Route 221 (US 221) and SC 110 in Chesnee. In 1939, it was decommissioned, with most of its path redesignated as part of SC 11.

Major intersections

Special routes

Salem business loop

South Carolina Highway 11 Business (SC 11 Bus.) was a business route in Salem. It was established in 1971 from SC 11 west-northwest of the town to SC 11 north-northeast of the town. In 1976, it was decommissioned and was mostly downgraded to secondary roads, with the exception of a small portion of SC 130, which had been extended into Salem by this time.

Chesnee alternate route

South Carolina Highway 11 Alternate (SC 11 Alt.) was an alternate route east of Chesnee. It was commissioned by 1940 between SC 11 and U.S. Route 221 (US 221; now US 221 Alternate) in the northwestern part of the Cowpens National Battlefield. At an unknown date, it was decommissioned and downgraded to a secondary road. It is now known as Edsel Drive.

See also

References

External links

 
 SC 11 at Virginia Highways' South Carolina Highways Annex
 Former SC 11 Alternate at Virginia Highways' South Carolina Highways Annex
 Former SC 11 Business at Virginia Highways' South Carolina Highways Annex

011
Transportation in Oconee County, South Carolina
Transportation in Pickens County, South Carolina
Transportation in Greenville County, South Carolina
Transportation in Spartanburg County, South Carolina
Transportation in Cherokee County, South Carolina